John Hill may refer to:

Business
 John Henry Hill (1791–1882), American businessman, educator and missionary
 John Hill (planter) (1824–1910), Scottish-born American industrialist and planter
 John Hill (businessman) (1847–1926), Australian coach-horse operator
 John J. Hill (1853–1952), English-born American stonemason and builder
 John A. Hill (1858–1916), American editor and publisher, co-founder of McGraw-Hill
 John Sprunt Hill (1869–1961), American lawyer, banker and philanthropist
 John W. Hill (1890–1977), American public relations executive

Entertainment
 John William Hill (1812–1879), British-born American artist
 John Hill (cartoonist) (1889–1974), New Zealand cartoonist
 John Hill (game designer) (1945–2015), American designer of Squad Leader and other wargames
 Dean Koontz or John Hill (born 1945), American author
 John Stephen Hill (born 1953), Canadian actor
 John Hill (screenwriter) (died 2017), American screenwriter and television producer
 John Hill (actor) (born 1978), American musical theater actor
 John Hill (conductor) (born 1843), Australian church organist and choirmaster
 John Hill (musician) (active from 1993), American guitarist with the Apples in Stereo and Dressy Bessy
 John Hill (record producer) (active 2008 and after), American record producer, songwriter, and musician
 John Hill (active 1968), English bassist in Band of Joy
 John Hill, British conspiracy theorist and creator of the 2007 documentary 7/7 Ripple Effect

Military 
John Hill (courtier) (before 1690–1735), British general and courtier, brother of Abigail Masham, Baroness Masham
John Hill (British Army officer) (fl. 1777–1783), British Army officer during the American War of Independence
John Hill (Royal Navy officer) (c. 1774–1855)
John Hill (Indian Army officer) (1866–1935), British general
John Hamar Hill or Johnnie Hill (1912–1998), British Royal Air Force officer
John Thomas Hill (1811–1902), British Army officer

Politics

United Kingdom
John Hill (died 1408), English Member of Parliament and Justice of the King's Bench
John Hill (MP for Wycombe) (fl. 1436), English MP for Wycombe
John Hill (MP for Dorchester) (1589–1657), English Member of Parliament for Dorchester
Sir John Hill, 3rd Baronet of the Hill baronets of Hawkstone (1740–1824), British MP for Shrewsbury
John Hill (British politician) (1912–2007), British Member of Parliament and Member of the European Parliament

United States
 John Hill (North Carolina politician) (1797–1861), United States Representative from North Carolina
 John Y. Hill (1799–1859), American builder and Kentucky state legislator
 John Hill (Virginia politician) (1800–1880), United States Representative from Virginia
 John Hill (New Jersey politician) (1821–1884), United States Representative from New Jersey
 John Fremont Hill (1855–1912), governor of Maine
 John Philip Hill (1879–1941), United States Representative from Maryland
 John Jerome Hill (1918-1986), American politician
 John Hill (Texas politician) (1923–2007), American lawyer and politician
 John Hill (Florida politician) (born 1931)

Elsewhere
John Hill (Australian politician) (born 1949), member of the South Australian House of Assembly

Science
 John Hill (botanist) (1716–1775), English botanist, editor, journalist, and novelist
 John Christopher Columbus Hill (1828–1904), American engineer
 Sir John McGregor Hill (1921–2008), British nuclear physicist and administrator
 John Edwards Hill (1928–1997), British mammalogist
 John Hill (physician) (1931–1972), American plastic surgeon

Sports

Baseball and cricket
 John Hill (English cricketer) (1867–1963), English cricketer
 John Hill (baseball) (1876–1922), American Negro leagues player
 John Hill (Irish cricketer) (1912–1984), Irish cricketer
 Jack Hill (cricketer) (1923–1974), Australian cricketer
 John Hill (New Zealand cricketer) (1930–2002), New Zealand cricketer
 John Hill (Queensland cricketer) (born 1956), Australian cricketer
 Pete Hill (John Preston Hill, 1882–1951), American baseball player

Football and rugby
John Ethan Hill (1865–1941), American mathematician and college football coach
John Hill (Scottish footballer) (fl. 1891–1892), Scottish footballer
Johnny Hill (footballer) (1884–1???), Scottish footballer
Jack Hill (footballer, born 1897) (1897–1972), English football player and manager
John Hill (rugby union) (fl. 1925), Australian rugby union player
John Hill (rugby league), rugby league footballer of the 1940s and 1950s
John Hill (American football) (1950–2018), American football player
John Hill (New Zealand footballer) (born 1950), Irish-born New Zealand footballer
John Mac Hill (1925–1995), Australian rules footballer for Collingwood
John Tye Hill (born 1982), American football player

Other sports
Johnny Hill (1905–1929), Scottish boxer
John Hill (boat racer) (1933–1993), British powerboat racer
John Hill (wrestler) (1942–2010), Canadian wrestler
John Hill (ice hockey) (born 1960), American ice hockey coach

Other people 
 John Hill (classicist) (1747–1805), Scottish minister and classicist
 John Hill (explorer) (c. 1810–1860), English explorer of South Australia
 John Edward Gray Hill (1839–1914), English solicitor
 John H. Hill (1852–1936), American lawyer, educator, school administrator, and soldier
 John Cathles Hill (1857–1915), Scottish architect
 John Hill (bishop) (1862–1943), English clergyman, inaugural Suffragan Bishop of Hulme
 John Hill (trade unionist) (1863–1945), British trade unionist
 John Wesley Hill (1863–1936), chancellor of Lincoln Memorial University in Harrogate, Tennessee
 John Hill (police officer) (1914–2004), British HM Chief Inspector of Constabulary for England and Wales
 John deKoven Hill (1920–1996), American architect
 John T. Hill (born 1934), teacher and author
 A pseudonym used by Victor Barker

Fictional characters
 John Hill, a character in Cheers

See also
John Ashdown-Hill (1949–2018), British historian
James John Hill (1811–1882), English painter
Johannes Hill (born 1988), German baritone
John Hill & Company, a former British toy company
John Hill House, a historic home in Erie, Pennsylvania
John Sprunt Hill House, a historic house in Durham, North Carolina
Jack Hill (disambiguation)
Jon Hill (disambiguation)
Jonathan Hill (disambiguation)
John Hills (disambiguation)